Marcelo Nicolás Lodeiro Benítez (born 21 March 1989), commonly known as Nicolás Lodeiro, is a Uruguayan professional footballer who plays as an attacking midfielder for MLS club Seattle Sounders FC and the Uruguay national team.

Lodeiro has played professionally in Uruguay, the Netherlands, Brazil, Argentina, and the United States, winning the Eredivisie in both of his seasons at Ajax, and winning the domestic double in 2015 with Boca Juniors. He also won titles with Nacional and Botafogo, as well as the 2016 and 2019 MLS Cup with Seattle.

A full international since 2009, Lodeiro has earned 60 caps for Uruguay. He has taken part in two FIFA World Cups with the national side, as well as four editions of the Copa América, the 2012 Summer Olympics, and the 2013 FIFA Confederations Cup, in which Uruguay finished fourth. He was also part of the teams which placed fourth in the 2010 FIFA World Cup and won the 2011 Copa América.

Club career

Early career

Lodeiro was born in 1989 in Paysandú, which borders Argentina. It was here that he made his first steps as a footballer in the youth sides of local club Barrio Obrero. It wasn't too long before his talent was recognised by a local scout called Daniel López who nurtured him to play for the youth team at Nacional Montevideo aged only 14 years old.

Nacional
Four years later, at the age of 18, Lodeiro made his debut for the Nacional first team against Fénix on 19 August 2007. Later on in the year he also scored his first senior goal and it was clear to see that in Lodeiro, there was a new star in the making.

A year later, Lodeiro continued to make progress, securing more playing time and even scored against River Plate in the Pre-Libertadores playoff. But 2009 was the year that Lodeiro really began to make progress. His three goals and several assists in the Copa Libertadores helped Nacional to reach the semi finals of the tournament. In April 2009 he was named 58th highest scorer in the world by the IFFHS following his performance in the Copa Libertadores

Lodeiro played a vital role for Nacional in the 2008–09 Copa Libertadores, which saw Nacional reach the Semi-finals. From then on, Lodeiro has been considered one of the best youth players in the country.

Ajax
In January 2010, Lodeiro signed a contract with AFC Ajax until June 2012 with option of 2 more years. He joined his fellow Uruguayans Bruno Silva and his friend Luis Suárez at Ajax. His first appearance for Ajax was as a substitute in the match against FC Twente on 7 February 2010. He marked his first goal against Go Ahead Eagles with Ajax on 25 March in the KNVB Beker. Because of an injury he sustained during the World Cup he didn't play a single match for Ajax in the 2010/2011 Eredivisie season. He did however make 19 appearances for Ajax the following season, scoring twice in the regular season, and once against Dinamo Zagreb in the Champions League, all while helping Ajax to win their 31st league title.

Botafogo
On 20 July 2012 it was announced that Botafogo had signed Lodeiro to a four-year contract, taking the young midfielder over to Rio de Janeiro from AFC Ajax for an undisclosed fee. He was a key part of the squad that won the Campeonato Carioca in 2013 and qualified Botafogo for the 2014 Copa Libertadores after 18 years absent of the tournament. During his time with Botafogo, Lodeiro was part of Uruguay's 2013 FIFA Confederations Cup and 2014 FIFA World Cup squad.

Corinthians
On 29 May 2014, Lodeiro signed a four-year deal with Corinthians, for a R$4.5 million fee.

Boca Juniors

In 2015, Lodeiro signed with Argentinian club Boca Juniors. In September 2015, Lodeiro scored against River Plate in the Superclásico. On 4 November 2015, Lodeiro scored a penalty in the 2015 Copa Argentina Final helping Boca defeat Rosario Central 2–0, and secure their domestic double.

Seattle Sounders FC
In the summer of 2016, Lodeiro was widely rumored to be moving to the Seattle Sounders of Major League Soccer. Lodeiro began discussing a transfer with Sounders general manager Garth Lagerwey during the Copa America Centenario, using teammate Luis Suarez as a translator. Lodeiro bid farewell to the Boca Juniors fans in late July amid reports that he would join the Sounders pending his physical. He officially signed with the Sounders on 27 July 2016.

He made his club debut on 31 July 2016, starting in the midfield and playing the full 90 minutes of a 1–1 home draw against LA Galaxy. In his first match, Lodeiro recorded 124 total touches, the fourth-highest total of the 2016 season for the Sounders, and 94 passes, the most for Seattle. He scored his first goal for the Sounders on 14 August 2016, at home against Real Salt Lake in the 24th minute of a 2–1 win at Century Link Field.

Lodeiro was also instrumental to the team's MLS Cup run in 2016 under caretaker manager Brian Schmetzer. He scored four goals and provided eight assists in 13 games in the regular season to help Seattle qualify for the playoffs; in the post-season, he scored four more goals in six play-off games as he led the team to the championship. In the MLS Cup Final against Toronto at BMO Field on 10 December, following a 0–0 draw after extra time, Lodeiro notched a penalty kick in the resulting shoot-out to keep the Sounders hopes alive; Justin Morrow then missed Toronto's next spot kick, which allowed Román Torres to win the first MLS Cup for the Sounders after netting his kick. When Lodeiro arrived, the Sounders were at the bottom of the league, but because of his ability to create and make others around him better, the Sounders were able to turn their season around. For his performances, he was named the 2016 MLS Newcomer of the Year.

On 9 December 2017, Lodeiro started in the 2017 MLS Cup Final, which was once again held at BMO Field against Toronto FC; on this occasion, however, Seattle lost 2–0, failing to defend their title.

On 10 November 2019, Lodeiro assisted Víctor Rodríguez's goal in a 3–1 home win over Toronto FC in the MLS Cup Final.

In the 2022 CONCACAF Champions League Final, he scored two penalties in the first leg in a 2–2 draw against UNAM, then another goal in a 3–0 win in the second leg, in which his club secured their first title in the competition by winning 5–2 on aggregate.

International career

Youth
During 2009, Lodeiro also progressed on the international scene with good performances for the Uruguay under-20 national team. This included outstanding performances at a South American under-20 tournament in Venezuela where he scored three goals and led Uruguay to third place. He also contributed impressively at the FIFA under-20 tournament in Egypt, scoring two goals in four matches.

Senior
His senior international debut for Uruguay came against Costa Rica, in the CONCACAF-CONMEBOL 2010 World Cup Play-Off. He played both legs of the play-off and, in the second leg at home, was named player of the match for Uruguay.

Lodeiro played for Uruguay in the 2010 FIFA World Cup finals and, in Uruguay's opening match against France, was the first player to receive a red card at the tournament.

Lodeiro scored his first international goal on 23 June 2011, in a 3–0 friendly home win over Estonia. He was a member of the Uruguay national team that won the 2011 Copa América in Argentina.

He was part of Uruguay's team at the 2012 Summer Olympics.

Lodeiro took part at the 2013 FIFA Confederations Cup in Brazil, where Uruguay finished in fourth place. During the tournament, he scored in an 8–0 win over Tahiti on 23 June, in Uruguay's final group match.

Lodeiro was a member of the Uruguay national team that participated in the 2014 FIFA World Cup in Brazil. He started two matches and came in as a substitute in a third.

In May 2015, Lodeiro was included by manager Oscar Tabárez in the final 23-man Uruguay squad for the upcoming Copa América.

Lodeiro was a member of the Uruguay national team that participated in the 2016 Copa América Centenario in the United States. Lodeiro started two matches and came in as a substitute in a third, acquiring one assist in total.

In May 2018, he was named in Uruguay's provisional 26-man squad for the 2018 FIFA World Cup in Russia; he missed out on the final 23-man squad for the tournament, however.

In March 2019, Lodeiro was included in the final 23-man Uruguay squad for the 2019 Copa América in Brazil. On 16 June, he scored the first goal in a 4–0 win over Ecuador in the team's opening group match of the tournament; this was Uruguay's 400th goal in the competition. Uruguay were eliminated by Peru in the quarter-finals of the tournament on 29 June, as a result of a 5–4 penalty shoot-out defeat, following a 0–0 draw after regulation time; Lodeiro did not appear during the match, however, and remained on the bench.

Style of play
A diminutive, dynamic, talented, and technically gifted midfielder, with a stocky build, Lodeiro was regarded as a promising prospect as a youngster. He is known for his ability to get past defenders due to his speed, close control, and dribbling skills, which earned him comparisons with compatriot Enzo Francescoli in his youth, as well as the nickname "the Uruguayan Messi." He also possesses good vision, creativity, and passing ability, which enables him to link-up with other players, create chances for teammates, and be involved in the build-up of his team's attacking plays. A versatile playmaker, Lodeiro likes to function in a free role in the centre of the pitch, and usually plays in the number 10 role as an attacking midfielder; in this position, he is given licence to drop deep and come towards a teammate in order to receive the ball and subsequently dictate play with his passing in midfield. However, he also likes to move wide towards the wings in order to overload flanks, and can often be found operating on either side of the pitch as well as in the middle during the course of the same match; as such, he is also capable of playing in several other positions, and has even been deployed as a winger on occasion, or even as a central midfielder, or also as a second striker. Moreover, he is a very energetic player, known for his defensive work-rate off the ball, longevity, tactical intelligence, and ability to mark opponents; his fitness, coupled with his excellent movement across the field enables him to press opposing players, create space by dragging opponents out of position, or make attacking runs from behind into the opposing penalty area. Lodeiro is naturally left footed, and is known for his powerful and accurate striking ability with his stronger foot, which also enables him to score goals, in addition to creating them; however, he is capable of playing off of either foot. Furthermore, he is a dangerous free kick taker, and is also known for his delivery from set pieces.

Personal life
In February 2018, Lodeiro earned a U.S. green card which qualifies him as a domestic player for MLS roster purposes.

Career statistics

Club

International

Scores and results list Uruguay Olympic team goal tally first, score column indicates score after each Lodeiro goal.

Scores and results list Uruguay's goal tally first, score column indicates score after each Lodeiro goal.

Honours
Nacional
Primera División: 2008–09
Torneo Apertura: 2008, 2009
Liguilla: 2008

Ajax
Eredivisie: 2010–11, 2011–12
KNVB Cup: 2009–10

Botafogo
Campeonato Carioca: 2013

Boca Juniors
Primera División: 2015
Copa Argentina: 2014–15

Seattle Sounders FC
MLS Cup: 2016, 2019
CONCACAF Champions League: 2022

Uruguay
Copa América: 2011

Individual
MLS Newcomer of the Year: 2016
CONCACAF Champions League Best XI: 2018, 2022
MLS All-Star: 2019
MLS Best XI: 2020

Notes

References

External links

 
 Player profile 
 
 Detailed Player Profile 
 
 

1989 births
Living people
Footballers from Paysandú
Uruguayan people of Galician descent
Uruguayan people of Spanish descent
Uruguayan footballers
Association football midfielders
Uruguayan Primera División players
Club Nacional de Football players
Eredivisie players
AFC Ajax players
Campeonato Brasileiro Série A players
Botafogo de Futebol e Regatas players
Sport Club Corinthians Paulista players
Argentine Primera División players
Boca Juniors footballers
Major League Soccer players
Seattle Sounders FC players
Designated Players (MLS)
Uruguayan expatriate footballers
Expatriate footballers in the Netherlands
Expatriate footballers in Brazil
Expatriate footballers in Argentina
Expatriate soccer players in the United States
Uruguayan expatriate sportspeople in the Netherlands
Uruguayan expatriate sportspeople in Brazil
Uruguayan expatriate sportspeople in Argentina
Uruguayan expatriate sportspeople in the United States
Uruguay under-20 international footballers
Olympic footballers of Uruguay
Footballers at the 2012 Summer Olympics
Uruguay international footballers
2010 FIFA World Cup players
2011 Copa América players
2013 FIFA Confederations Cup players
2014 FIFA World Cup players
2015 Copa América players
Copa América Centenario players
2019 Copa América players
Copa América-winning players